Șipca (Shypka) is a commune in the Grigoriopol sub-district of Transnistria, Moldova. It is composed of two villages, Șipca and Vesioloe (Веселе, Весёлое). It is currently under the administration of the breakaway government of the Transnistrian Moldovan Republic.

References

Communes of Transnistria
Kherson Governorate